Andrew Winch is an internationally known English yacht designer based in Barnes, London. He has been selected as one of two design teams for business jet interior development of the Boeing 787.

Yacht designer
Founded in 1986, Winch Design is a London-based design studio.

List of yachts designed
This is a list of yachts designed by Winch, as listed on the website.

Awards
Winch has won a number of International Superyacht Society awards for design and styling, including the:
1992 award for Best Sail 23m+ as stylist and interior designer
1996 award for Best Power 43m+ as stylist and interior designer, and Best Power Interior as Interior Designer
1997 award for Best Power 43m+ as stylist and interior designer
2001 award for Best Power 43m+ and Best Sail 23m-36m as interior designer
2002 award for Best Sail 36m+ and Best Sail Interior as interior designer
2006 award for Best Sail 23m-36m as designer and interior designer
2009 award for Best Power 40m-65m as designer, stylist and interior designer, and Best Overall Interior
In recent years, awards are given for approximately 7 categories.

Aircraft design experience
Lufthansa Technik is a Hamburg, Germany–based subsidiary of Lufthansa that has been tasked to design the Boeing 787 into a business jet. Boeing has announced one 787-8 order and three 787-9 orders in the business jet segment. Around 2001, Winch was first commissioned to work with the firm to convert a client's Boeing BBJ.

Andrew Winch Designs and Lufthansa Technik have partnered to design a business jet interior for the 787. The team has been described by journalists as "one of the most innovative and technically competent design teams

787 design specifics
The LHT/Winch design has a forward lounge (certified for 12 people) which incorporates a 50 inch plasma screen on the forward bulkhead. Aft from the forward lounge are two guest cabins, to right and left. An additional VIP suite is planned. Upon entering the main number 3 door, there is a highly visible dining and conference room is intended to be a prime feature of the design. There is an integrated movie theater, which is also designed as a second social seating area. Further aft is a VIP suite with a full width master stateroom.

Custom design for Roman Abramovich

He designed a private Boeing 767-33A/ER, registered in Aruba as P4-MES for Russian billionaire Roman Abramovich. It is known as The Bandit due to its livery. Originally the aircraft was ordered by Hawaiian Airlines but the order was cancelled and Abramovich bought it from Boeing and refitted it to his own requirements by Andrew Winch, who designed the interior and exterior. The aircraft was estimated in 2016 to cost 300 million and its interior is reported to include a 30-seat dining room, a boardroom, master bedrooms, luxury bathrooms with showers, and a spacious living room. The aircraft has the same air missile avoidance system as Air Force One.

References

External links
 

Year of birth missing (living people)
Living people
English designers
British yacht designers
Aircraft designers
British interior designers
Andrew Winch